Edward Bond (October 1844 – 18 August 1920) was a Conservative Party politician in England.

He unsuccessfully contested the 1892 general election in Southwark West, and at the 1895 general election he was elected as Member of Parliament (MP) for Nottingham East. He was re-elected in  1900, but at the  1906 general election he was defeated by the Liberal Party candidate, Henry John Stedman Cotton.

References

External links 
 

1844 births
1920 deaths
Conservative Party (UK) MPs for English constituencies
UK MPs 1895–1900
UK MPs 1900–1906
Members of London County Council